Dragon Storm may refer to:

 Dragon Storm (game), a role-playing game and collectible card game
 Dragon Storm (astronomy), the Dragon Storm on Saturn
 Dragon Storm (film), a Sci-Fi Channel original movie
 SpellForce 2: Dragon Storm, a role-playing and real-time strategy hybrid video game